Youssouph Cheikh Sylla (born 20 February 1998) is a Senegalese football player. He plays for Italian  club Alessandria on loan from Pordenone. He played all of his career so far in Italy, advancing from the fifth tier to the second.

Club career
He started his senior career in the fifth and fourth tier (Eccellenza and Serie D).

He made his professional Serie C debut for Piacenza on 22 September 2018 against Pontedera.

On 5 August 2021, he signed a three-year contract with Serie B club Pordenone. On 18 August 2021, Pordenone loaned him to Serie C club Siena. However, Italian Football Federation did not approve the loan and he returned to Pordenone on 28 August.

He made his Serie B debut for Pordenone on 18 September 2021 in a game against Cittadella.

On 31 August 2022, Sylla was loaned to Alessandria, with an option to buy.

References

External links
 

1998 births
People from Diourbel Region
Living people
Senegalese footballers
Association football forwards
Piacenza Calcio 1919 players
A.C. Gozzano players
Pordenone Calcio players
A.C.N. Siena 1904 players
U.S. Alessandria Calcio 1912 players
Serie D players
Serie C players
Serie B players
Senegalese expatriate footballers
Expatriate footballers in Italy
Senegalese expatriate sportspeople in Italy